Felicia Linda Oh (born in Seattle, Washington, on December 13, 1967) is an American submission grappling competitor and martial arts instructor. Oh earned her black belt in Brazilian Jiu-Jitsu under senior instructor Jean Jacques Machado.

Biography
Felicia began training in Brazilian Jiu-Jitsu in November 2000 after being introduced to the art by her friend’s husband at the age of 33. Shortly thereafter she enrolled at Brazilian Jiu-Jitsu master Jean Jacques Machado’s school in Tarzana, California. She quickly excelled in the art and after only 4.5 years of training under Machado was promoted to black belt in June 2005. In addition to training under Jean Jacques Machado,  Felicia also trains under fellow Machado black belt and 10th planet jiu-jitsu founder Eddie Bravo.

Felicia has won many championships including winning the ADCC North American Trials securing her spot to represent the USA at the ADCC World Submission Wrestling Championship (ADCC) where she had convincing victories over a multi-time BJJ World Champion and a Japanese superstar putting her in the finals of the most prestigious grappling event in the world. She was also one of the first to win the IBJJF Pan American Jiu-Jitsu Championship in both the black belt Gi and No-Gi divisions in 2007. Felicia is #6 of the Female Dirty Dozen of Brazilian Jiu-Jitsu. In addition to training and teaching seminars, her most recent endeavour is designing and producing BJJ inspired art and accessories. FLAU - for love, art utility™ (www.forartloveutility.com)

Oh currently teaches private lessons and seminars in Submission Grappling, Brazilian Jiu-Jitsu, and Fitness. Oh was  an interviewer for  GrappleTV and can be heard as part of the GrappleTV Podcast.
She also works as an inspector for the California State Athletic Commission.

Education
Felicia holds a Bachelor of Fine Arts degree in Fine Art from Cornish College of the Arts in Seattle and a Master of Fine Arts degree in Fine Art/New Genres from the University of California, Los Angeles. She worked as a Broadcast Designer in Hollywood and was one of the first lecturers in the Digital Media Department at Otis College of Art and Design before concentrating on her martial arts career full-time.

Instructor lineage
Kanō Jigorō → Tomita Tsunejirō → Mitsuyo "Count Koma" Maeda → Carlos Gracie Sr. → Carlos Gracie Jr. → Jean Jacques Machado → Felicia Oh

Titles
 2018 IBJJF Masters World Champion
 2014 IBJJF Masters World Champion
 2009 FILA World Champion, 50 kg, Gi
 2009 FILA World Champion, 50 kg, No-Gi
 2009 USA World Team member
 2009 USA Grappling World Team Trials champion
 2008 FILA Grappling Silver Medalist
 2008 USA Grappling World Team Trials Champion
 2008 USA World Team Member
 2008 IBJJF World No-Gi Silver Medalist
 2007 12th GrapplersQuest West Adv. No-Gi Absolute Champion
 2007 FILA Grappling World Champion
 2007 USA Grappling World Team Trials Champion
 2007 USA Grappling Team Qualifying Trials Champion
 2007 USA World Team Member
 2007 ADCC Submission Wrestling World Championship Finalist
 2007 IBJJF World No-Gi Silver Medalist
 2007 IBJJF World Gi Bronze Medalist
 2007 IBJJF Pan American Jiu Jitsu Black Belt Champion
 2007 IBJJF Pan American Jiu Jitsu No-Gi Black Belt Champion
 2006 ADCC North American Submission Wrestling Trials Champion
 2006 US Open of Submission Grappling Absolute Champion
 2006 US Open of Submission Grappling (Class B) Advanced Division Champion
 2005 Pan American Games of Submission Grappling Advanced Division Champion
 2005 Pan American Games of Submission Grappling Absolute Silver Medalist
 2005 GrapplersQuest VII (Class A) Advanced Division Champion
 2005 GrapplersQuest VII (Class B) Advanced Division Champion
 2004 GrapplersQuest VI Advanced Division Champion
 2004 GrapplersQuest VI Absolute Silver Medalist
 U.S. Open Professional Women’s Division Champion 2004
 U.S. Open 2003 – Champion
 Pan American No-Gi Championships 2003 – Champion
 Tito Ortiz Submission Wrestling Invitational 2003 – Champion
 Grappling Games 2003 No-Gi – Champion
 Copa Pacifica 2003 – Champion
 California State Championships 2002 – Champion
 Grappling Games 2001 – Champion
 2007 Inducted into the "Masters Hall of Fame" for "Outstanding Contributions To The Martial Arts".

References

External links
 Felicia Oh Official Website
 Felicia Oh Official Blog

Living people
1967 births
American practitioners of Brazilian jiu-jitsu
Female Brazilian jiu-jitsu practitioners
Sportspeople from Seattle
Sportspeople from Los Angeles
Cornish College of the Arts alumni
Digital media educators
American sportswomen
21st-century American women